The Waycross Historic District is a  historic district which was listed on the National Register of Historic Places in 1976.

The district then included 237 contributing buildings and one contributing structure.

See also
Downtown Waycross Historic District

References

External links

Historic districts on the National Register of Historic Places in Georgia (U.S. state)
Victorian architecture in Georgia (U.S. state)
Second Empire architecture in Georgia (U.S. state)
Buildings and structures completed in 1895
National Register of Historic Places in Ware County, Georgia